The President of Stony Brook University serves as the university's Chief Executive Officer. Stony Brook's President, in addition to his or her duties to the university's many academic programs, also oversees the Stony Brook University Hospital with its five health science programs and 120 community-based service centers. The President additionally plays an integral role in the economic development of Long Island, New York through Stony Brook's capacity as co-manager of the Brookhaven National Laboratory.

The duties of the President are wide-ranging and the are tied to a broader governance structure of the State University of New York system, including its Chancellor, Board of Trustees, University Faculty Senate and Student Assembly. Furthermore, the President receives oversight and advice from the Stony Brook Council, presently chaired by Kevin S. Law, President and CEO of the Long Island Association.

The current Interim President is Michael A. Bernstein. On July 1, 2020, Maurie D. McInnis assumed office as the 6th President of Stony Brook, only the second woman in the university's history appointed to that position.

Dean of State University College on Long Island

Presidents of Stony Brook University

Provosts of Stony Brook University

Presidents of University Senate

References 

 
Stony Brook University